San Marin High School is a public high school located in Novato, California, in the United States.

History

San Marin High School opened in 1968 in Novato.

Robert Vieth became principal in 2007, after the former principal was dismissed by the District's board, resulting in extended protests by parents, staff, and students.  Vieth established the first code of conduct for student athletes and coaches in Marin County and began the San Marin Plus school-within-a-school program in 2010 for credit deficient students. Vieth announced plans for his retirement in March 2011.

Campus
The school occupies , with a total of 51 classrooms, one gymnasium and one mini-gym, a student center, library, college and career center, media room, art department, gym, and science lab.  All the facilities have recently been upgraded thanks to the Facility Bond. The seniors have a tradition of chalking their graduating class year on a hill on the north side of the school named, "Senior Hill".

Athletic facilities include tennis and basketball courts, baseball and softball diamonds, soccer field and a newly upgraded artificial turf football field and an all-weather track.

The school also has a STEM building, in regards to their STEM program, the building was built upon the north-eastern campus area. Construction concluded in 2020, and was specifically meant for students who participated in the program. The classrooms were of the 'modern' structure, there are TVs, chemistry labs, and group working opportunities built in. There is even a 'lounge' and more.

Demographics
2014–2015
1,020 students: 529 male (51.9%), 491 female (48.1%)

Curriculum

San Marin High School serves grades 9–12, and offers a comprehensive program of study to approximately 1040 students.  San Marin has established educational objectives aimed at providing students with challenging learning experiences in academics, as well as providing assistance with choosing future educational and career choices.  Students are given opportunities to take classes in performing arts, visual arts, athletics, Regional Occupational Program courses, Advanced Placement and Honors Courses, and Sheltered Courses.  In particular, R.O.P. (Regional Occupational Program)(493 students), A.P. (453 students) and honors enrollment (140 students) has climbed dramatically.

STEM Programs - San Marin is notable for its strong and successful STEM (Science, Technology, Engineering, and Math) programs. Both of San Marin's STEM programs focus on preparing students for college and career through rigorous, hands-on, project based learning experiences. San Marin's STEM programs include STEM Marin and the Biotechnology Academy.

STEM Marin was founded in 2013. STEM Marin enrolls 60 9th graders each year and students take two science or engineering courses each school year as well as math each year. STEM Marin courses are blocked together in 9th and 10th grades so students take physics and engineering every day for two hours per day in 9th grade and biology and biotechnology during 10th grade. In 11th grade, students take chemistry and one STEM elective, and in 12th grade, students take senior capstone engineering and one STEM elective. In 2015, STEM Marin teacher Nick Williams won the prestigious Milken Educator Award

Biotechnology Academy was founded in 2015 although there have been biotechnology courses at San Marin since 2009. Biotechnology Academy enrolls 60 9th graders each year and students are cohorted together for technology of biology, English, and health/college and career readiness during 9th grade. Students are also cohorted together for chemistry of biotechnology and English 10th grade, and then take biotechnology 1 during 11th grade and biotechnology 2 during 12th grade.

San Marin High School was recognized as a 2017 California Gold Ribbon School for its STEM and arts programs.

The school has 62 teachers, 25 classified staff and a regional occupational program. The school newspaper is called The Pony Express.

Performing and Visual Arts 
San Marin offers a wealth of performance opportunities. The performing arts, and visual arts program is called the SMART program.

Drama Department
The Drama Department offers drama and advanced drama programs and produces two full-length Drama productions (fall and spring), beginning drama winter play and various 'cafe theaters.' Among many other awards, the Drama students recently won First Place (Command Performance with perfect score) in the Sacramento State Statewide Lenaea Drama Festival and first places in both Monologue and Scene Category at the Marin Theater Company Scene Fest.  The Drama department was also invited to perform at the Edinburgh Fringe Festival with AHSTF during the summer of 2009. In 2020, the drama department won the bronze award at the Lanaea Theater Festival for its production of “Hard Candy.”

Music Department
An extensive music experience is provided. In addition to Concert/Jazz choirs and bands during normal school hours, the music department offers show choir, 3 Jazz Combos, Music theater, Music Technology, and other small ensembles. The department presents two full-length musicals with orchestra and tech crew; a madrigal feast, featuring music, drama, and dancing; 9 concerts; district music festival; and community events. Students also attend regional, national and international music festivals and won numerous awards.

Visual Art Department
A variety of art classes using different media are offered.  The classes are Art and Design, 3D Art, Glass Art, Photography 1, Photography 2 and AP Photography, Drawing and Painting, and AP Art, for which students can receive college credit for approved portfolios.

Extracurricular activities

San Marin students are involved in a wide range of co-curricular and extra-curricular activities with many opportunities for parent involvement.  Parent organizations include PTSA, Sports Boosters, Music Boosters, Drama Boosters, Art Boosters, the English Language Advisory Committee. These groups are very active in supporting the school.

Sports

San Marin High School athletic teams participates in the North Coast Section, Marin County Athletic League programs.  The school is known for its successful athletic program.  San Marin has thirty two sports teams and three seasons (Fall, Winter, Spring) of sports for girls and boys.  The Sports Boosters is instrumental for raising funds for the athletic and sports programs at San Marin.

Fall Sports – Cross Country (Co-Ed Varsity), Football (Co-Ed, Frosh, JV, Varsity), Girls Tennis, Girls Volleyball (Frosh, JV, Varsity), Water Polo (Boys and Girls Varsity, Boys JV), Girls Golf and Cheerleading (Boys and Girls).

Winter Sports – Basketball (Frosh, JV, Varsity), Wrestling and Cheerleading (Boys and Girls). Soccer (Boys JV and Varsity & Girls JV and Varsity)

Spring Sports – Baseball (Boys Frosh, JV, Varsity), Lacrosse (Boys and Girls Varsity), Boys Golf, Softball (JV, Varsity), Swimming (Co-Ed), Boys Tennis, Track and Field (Co-Ed) and Boys Volleyball.

In 2001 the San Marin Football had its first and only undefeated football season going (12–0).  They won the MCAL and North Coast Section 2A Championships.

Other accomplishments are:  2005 Track team won MCAL Girls and Boys High Jump championships and 3200 meters frosh-soph championship, 2006 Cross country team won MCAL girl's Championship with 3rd fastest time on MCAL course, 2006 Girls Tennis MCAL doubles championship, 2006 North Coast Section Champion Girls Softball, 2006 North Coast Section Champion Boys Baseball

San Marin recently won the 2007 MCAL Girls Tennis Champions, 2007 MCAL Championship Boys Baseball, 2007 North Coast Section Girls Softball Champion, the 2008 Varsity Baseball NCS Champions, and JV Baseball MCAL Champions.

Student clubs

San Marin students are involved in many extracurricular activities and, under the umbrella of the Leadership Class, the students are encouraged to form students clubs for various interests and disciplines.

The various student clubs in San Marin are: Anime Club, Art Club, Artemis: An Animal Rights Club, Card Game Club, CSF (California Scholarship Foundation), Current Events Club, Environmental Club, French Club, Friday Night Lights Club, The Vinyl Frontier (vinyl record club), Games Club, Gardening Club, Gossima Cult (Ping-Pong Club), Interact Club, Me to We Club, Mock Trial, Mock UN , Random Acts of Kindness Club, Save the Waves Club, Speech and Debate Club, the Robotics Club (Penguin Empire Robotics), NAQT Quiz Bowl, and Ultimate Frisbee Club.

The San Marin School Website  was developed by the Website club and maintained jointly by the students and PTSA.

The Robotics Club  won the Rookie of the Year, 2nd place overall and the website awards at their first FIRST Robotics Competition UC Davis Regional Competition and regional tournament in March 2008. The club went on to compete at the FIRST World Championship in Houston, TX during the 2019 season.

In the 2011–2012 season, San Marin's Speech and Debate team secured six medals/trophies during their first year of competing in the Parliamentary Debate category.

Notable Controversies 
During the 1990s and early 2000s, San Marin received significant media coverage locally and nationally for the intolerant behavior of some students and parents.

Until it was banned in 1992, one of several themed annual "spirit days" was Slave Day. According to a 1999 Salon article written on the school's history, "students dressed in tattered clothes and chains were "auctioned" to other students, whom they were then required to serve for the day." Images of this day from the 1987-1988 year book circulated in 2020, drawing shock from students and community members.

Reports of racial and ethnic intolerance began as early as 1995, when an American-born Asian-American senior at the school was beaten by a group of teenagers shouting racial slurs and telling him to go back to China. The one assailant who took responsibility was sentenced to 20 hours of community service.

In early 1998, a student yelled racial epithets at members of the visiting Tamalpais High School basketball team. In reaction to the slurs and actions committed by the San Marin High student, parents of four of the black students from Tamalpais filed suit against the Novato Unified School District, charging that a "climate of intolerance" was allowed at San Marin.  The Marin County Athletic League put San Marin on probation for more than a year, citing its "hostile environment".

In the 1998–99 school year, San Marin received widespread media coverage after repeated incidents of hate crimes committed against one of their openly gay students.  He was beaten by three youths off campus on September 15, 1998, soon after forming the Gay-Straight Alliance at San Marin.  The Novato Police offered a reward, but the attackers were never identified.  Some students at the school, which had been stressing tolerance at a series of "respect days" that year, spoke out in support of the victim and 1000 students and faculty walked out of San Marin to show support for him and pride in their school.  The next day, San Marin's principal was reassigned to a District office. Novato's city manager, Rod Wood, referred to "a small group of individuals who are  fairly socially maladjusted", who identified themselves as white supremacists and called themselves "the hicks".

The school's behavior code was modified, outlining a range of punishments for racial/ethnic/sexual slurs including reprimand, parental notification, detention on Saturday afternoon, expulsion and police referral.

Misbehavior by the parents of a San Marin basketball player on February 2, 2008, in two games with Tam High teams led to drafting of the first code-of-conduct contracts for parents of athletes at a Marin County school. Following a girls junior varsity game at Tam, the mother of a San Marin player followed two referees, shouting obscene insults; later at San Marin, two parents of San Marin players confronted Tam's coach after he made a gesture indicating that the home team had choked.  Novato police were called and the parents were later asked not to attend the remaining games of the season.

In 2022, Novato Unified School district led a probe into a group of incidents where San Marin athletes used racial slurs during basketball and football games. The probe did not find evidence that San Marin athletes used racial slurs during games against San Rafael High, San Mateo High, and Tamalpais High.

Notable alumni 
Jalal Leach (1987) 
Mike Wise (1982) – NFL and UC Davis defensive end
Richard Day (1980) - Hollywood writer and producer, best known for Mad About You and Arrested Development
Brad Muster (1983) – NFL and Stanford University running back
Bud Norris (2003) – MLB pitcher (Houston Astros, Baltimore Orioles, San Diego Padres, Atlanta Braves, Los Angeles Dodgers, Los Angeles Angels, St. Louis Cardinals)
Brett Carolan (1989) – NFL tight end; Marin Athletic Foundation Outstanding Student Athlete
Michael Kearney (1990) – graduated at age 6 after one year at San Marin; world's youngest college graduate
Mike McCoy (1990) – NFL Head Coach (San Diego Chargers) and University of Utah quarterback
Bret Bergmark (1992) – mixed martial artist ("The Angry Hick")
Meagan McCray (2005) – Women's Professional Soccer goalkeeper
Manny Wilkins (2013) - Arizona State Sun Devils football quarterback 2014-2018
Brent Moore (1981) - linebacker for the Green Bay Packers
Juan Alderete (1981) - Grammy-award winning bassist for The Mars Volta and Marilyn Manson

References

External links 
 San Marin High School website
 Novato Unified School District
 Archive of Pony Express 2003–2006

High schools in Marin County, California
Public high schools in California
Novato, California
1967 establishments in California